The women's 4 × 200 metres relay event at the 1970 European Athletics Indoor Championships was held on 14 March in Vienna. Each athlete ran one lap of the 200 metres track.

Results

References

4 × 400 metres relay at the European Athletics Indoor Championships
Relay